Dimitar Dimitrov (born January 12, 1952) is a Bulgarian former volleyball player who competed in the 1980 Summer Olympics.

In 1980 he was part of the Bulgarian team which won the silver medal in the Olympic tournament. He played five matches.

He is the father of tennis player Grigor Dimitrov.

External links
profile

1952 births
Living people
Bulgarian men's volleyball players
Olympic volleyball players of Bulgaria
Volleyball players at the 1980 Summer Olympics
Olympic silver medalists for Bulgaria
Olympic medalists in volleyball
Medalists at the 1980 Summer Olympics